"(I'm Settin') Fancy Free" (sometimes known as "I'm Setting Fancy Free" or simply "Fancy Free") is the title song written by Roy August and Jimbeau Hinson, and recorded by American country music group The Oak Ridge Boys.  It was released in August 1981 as the second single from the album Fancy Free.  The song reached No. 1 on the Billboard Hot Country Singles chart in November 1981, during The Oak Ridge Boys' peak of popularity, and it is considered one of their signature songs.

Charts

References

Works cited
 Whitburn, Joel, "Top Country Songs: 1944-2005," 2006.

1981 songs
The Oak Ridge Boys songs
Song recordings produced by Ron Chancey
MCA Records singles
Songs written by Jimbeau Hinson